Beaver Cove may refer to:
 Beaver Cove, Maine, U.S.
 Beaver Cove (British Columbia), a cove on Vancouver Island, Canada
 Beaver Cove, British Columbia, a community on the cove of the same name
 Beaver Cove, Nova Scotia, Canada
 Beaver Cove, Newfoundland and Labrador, Canada, the name of several places

See also
Beaver Harbour (disambiguation)